Hickel is a surname. Notable people with the surname include:

 Anton Hickel (1745–1798),  Austrian painter
 Ermalee Hickel (1925–2017), American philanthropist
 Hal Hickel, Academy Award-winning visual effects animator for Industrial Light & Magic
 Paul Robert Hickel (1865–1935), botanist
 Svenja Hickel (born 1990), German female artistic gymnast
 Walter Joseph Hickel (1919–2010), American politician, former Governor of Alaska and U.S. Secretary of the Interior
 Zoe Hickel (born 1992), American women's ice hockey player